Cheragi Pahar (sometimes written Cheragee Pahar) is a cultural and historical place located at Chittagong, Bangladesh. Most of the cultural activities of Chittagong and related business were established in the place. Some parts of the region Momin Road are the part of Cheragee Pahar Circle.

Cultural activities 

The poets, authors, little magazine activist, artists, musicians, journalists, dramatist, model and cultural workers gather at Cheragee Pahar Circle every day. Pohela Boishakh, Pohela Falgun is celebrated in every year at the place.

In 2012, a site specific art exhibition held at the place, where young artists and curator experiments with new art forms and media in his exhibitions.

Media and communications
Several newspapers, including daily newspapers, opposition newspaper, business newspapers based in Chittagong are published from the place. Various little magazines are also published and distributed from Cheragi Pahar. BEside the newspapers offices, cultural-book shops can also be found here.

Newspaper publishes 
 The Daily Azadi
 The Daily Bhorer Kagoj

Gallery

References

External links

Culture in Chittagong
Neighbourhoods in Bangladesh
Buildings and structures in Chittagong